Brzeźno Pier (Polish: Molo w Brzeżnie) - a pier located in Brzeźno, one of the resort boroughs of Gdańsk, Pomeranian Voivodeship; in Poland. The pier was built in the second half of the nineteenth century, with a length of 100 metres. The pier was later expanded after World War II and currently has a length of 136 metres and a width of 7.2 metres.

References

Piers in Poland
Buildings and structures in Gdańsk